The 192nd Mixed Brigade was a unit of the Spanish Republican Army created during the Spanish Civil War. Deployed on the Extremadura front, the unit played a minor role during the war.

History 
The unit was created on April 30, 1938 from reservists from 1925 and 1926. Previously, an Asturian brigade had used this numbering in the north. The new 192nd Mixed Brigade, which was initially part of the 53rd Division of XVII Army Corps, would later be added to the 29th Division of the VI Army Corps. Command was passed to the militia major Abelardo Belenguer Alcober.

The organization of the unit was long delayed and it was not until July that it was complete. In November 1938 the 192nd Mixed Brigade was assigned to the 68th Division. Its garrison was in the Santa Quiteria Mines. It didn't participate in the Battle of Peñarroya, in January 1939, due to its weak organization.

Command 
 Commanders
 Militia major Abelardo Belenguer Alcober;

Notes

References

Bibliography 
 
 
 

Military units and formations established in 1938
Military units and formations disestablished in 1939
Mixed Brigades (Spain)
Military units and formations of the Spanish Civil War
Military history of Spain
Armed Forces of the Second Spanish Republic